Viscount Ingestre, eldest son of the Earl of Shrewsbury
Lord Stanley of Bickerstaffe, eldest son of the Earl of Derby
Lord Herbert of Cardiff, eldest son of the Earl of Pembroke and Montgomery
Lord Courtenay, eldest son of the Earl of Devon
Viscount Andover, eldest son of the Earl of Suffolk
Viscount Feilding, eldest son of the Earl of Denbigh
Lord Norreys, eldest son of the Earl of Lindsey
Viscount Maidstone, eldest son of the Earl of Winchelsea
Viscount Hinchingbrooke, eldest son of the Earl of Sandwich
Viscount Woodstock, eldest son of the Earl of Portland
Viscount Bury, eldest son of the Earl of Albemarle
Viscount Villiers, eldest son of the Earl of Jersey
Lord Balniel, eldest son of the Earl of Crawford
Lord Hay, eldest son of the Earl of Erroll
Lord Strathnaver, eldest son of the Countess of Sutherland
Lord Aberdour, eldest son of the Earl of Morton
Lord Cardross, eldest son of the Earl of Buchan
Lord Montgomerie, eldest son of the Earl of Eglinton
Lord Berriedale, eldest son of the Earl of Caithness
Lord Doune, eldest son of the Earl of Moray
Viscount Strathallan, eldest son of the Earl of Perth
Lord Glamis, eldest son of the Earl of Strathmore and Kinghorne
Lord Binning, eldest son of the Earl of Haddington
Viscount of Maitland, eldest son of the Earl of Lauderdale
Viscount of Garnock, eldest son of the Earl of Lindsay
Viscount of Dupplin, eldest son of the Earl of Kinnoull
Lord Bruce of Kinloss, eldest son of the Earl of Elgin
Lord Neidpath, eldest son of the Earl of Wemyss
Lord Ramsay of Dalhousie, eldest son of the Earl of Dalhousie
Lord Ogilvy of Airlie, eldest son of the Earl of Airlie
Lord Balgonie, eldest son of the Earl of Leven
Lord Huntingtower, eldest son of the Earl of Dysart
Lord Daer, eldest son of the Baron Selkirk of Douglas (disclaimed Earldom of Selkirk)
Lord Rosehill, eldest son of the Earl of Northesk
Lord Scrymgeour, eldest son of the Earl of Dundee
Lord Johnstone, eldest son of the Earl of Annandale and Hartfell
Lord Cochrane, eldest son of the Earl of Dundonald
Viscount of Kirkwall, eldest son of the Earl of Orkney
Viscount of Reidhaven, eldest son of the Earl of Seafield
Viscount Dalrymple, eldest son of the Earl of Stair
Lord Dalmeny, eldest son of the Earl of Rosebery
Viscount of Kelburn, eldest son of the Earl of Glasgow
Viscount Tamworth, eldest son of the Earl Ferrers
Lord Guernsey, eldest son of the Earl of Aylesford
Viscount Chewton, eldest son of the Earl Waldegrave
Viscount Petersham, eldest son of the Earl of Harrington
Viscount Lymington, eldest son of the Earl of Portsmouth
Lord Brooke, eldest son of the Earl of Warwick
Viscount Royston, eldest son of the Earl of Hardwicke
Viscount Folkestone, eldest son of the Earl of Radnor
Viscount Althorp, eldest son of the Earl Spencer
Lord Apsley, eldest son of the Earl Bathurst
Lord Hyde, eldest son of the Earl of Clarendon
Viscount of Stormont, eldest son of the Earl of Mansfield 
Lord Porchester, eldest son of the Earl of Carnarvon
Viscount Chelsea, eldest son of the Earl Cadogan
Viscount Fitz-Harris, eldest son of the Earl of Malmesbury
Viscount Dungarvan, eldest son of the Earl of Cork
Lord Ardee, eldest son of the Earl of Meath
Viscount Moore, eldest son of the Earl of Drogheda
Viscount Forbes, eldest son of the Earl of Granard
Lord Clifton of Rathmore, eldest son of the Earl of Darnley
Viscount Duncannon, eldest son of the Earl of Bessborough
Viscount Ikerrin, eldest son of the Earl of Carrick
Viscount Boyle, eldest son of the Earl of Shannon
Viscount Stopford, eldest son of the Earl of Courtown
Viscount Pollington, eldest son of the Earl of Mexborough
Viscount Jocelyn, eldest son of the Earl of Roden
Viscount Vaughan, eldest son of the Earl of Lisburne
Lord Gilford, eldest son of the Earl of Clanwilliam
Viscount Dunluce, eldest son of the Earl of Antrim
Lord Silchester, eldest son of the Earl of Longford
Viscount Carlow, eldest son of the Earl of Portarlington
Lord Naas, eldest son of the Earl of Mayo
Viscount Glerawly, eldest son of the Earl Annesley
Viscount Crichton, eldest son of the Earl of Erne
Lord Bingham, eldest son of the Earl of Lucan
Viscount Corry, eldest son of the Earl Belmore
Viscount Suirdale, eldest son of the Earl of Donoughmore
Viscount Alexander, eldest son of the Earl of Caledon
Lord Loughborough, eldest son of the Earl of Rosslyn
Viscount Cranley, eldest son of the Earl of Onslow
Viscount Grey de Wilton, eldest son of the Earl of Wilton
Viscount Glentworth, eldest son of the Earl of Limerick
Viscount Clive, eldest son of the Earl of Powis
Viscount Merton, eldest son of the Earl Nelson
Lord Oxmantown, eldest son of the Earl of Rosse
Viscount Somerton, eldest son of the Earl of Normanton
Viscount Lowther, eldest son of the Earl of Lonsdale
Viscount Sandon, eldest son of the Earl of Harrowby
Viscount Melgund, eldest son of the Earl of Minto
Viscount Grimston, eldest son of the Earl of Verulam
Lord Eliot, eldest son of the Earl of St Germans
Viscount Boringdon, eldest son of the Earl of Morley
Viscount Newport, eldest son of the Earl of Bradford
Viscount Encombe, eldest son of the Earl of Elden
Viscount Curzon, eldest son of the Earl Howe
Viscount Durwich, eldest son of the Earl of Stradbroke
Lord Langton, eldest son of the Earl Temple of Stowe
Viscount Newry, eldest son of the Earl of Kilmorey
Viscount Northland, eldest son of the Earl of Ranfurly
Viscount Anson, eldest son of the Earl of Lichfield
Viscount Granville, eldest son of the Earl Granville
Lord Howard of Effingham, eldest son of the Earl of Effingham
Lord Ducie, eldest son of the Earl of Ducie
Lord Worsley, eldest son of the Earl of Yarborough
Viscount Coke, eldest son of the Earl of Leicester
Viscount Campden, eldest son of the Earl of Gainsborough
Viscount Enfield, eldest son of the Earl of Strafford
Viscount Dangan, eldest son of the Earl Cowley
Viscount Ednam, eldest son of the Earl of Dudley
Viscount Tarbat, eldest son of the Earl of Cromartie
Viscount Carlton, eldest son of the Earl of Wharncliffe
Viscount Garmoyle, eldest son of the Earl Cairns
Viscount Wolmer, eldest son of the Earl of Selborne
Lord Medway, eldest son of the Earl of Cranbrook
Viscount Errington, eldest son of the Earl of Cromer
Viscount Hawkesbury, eldest son of the Earl of Liverpool
Viscount Borodale, eldest son of the Earl Beatty
Viscount Dawick, eldest son of the Earl Haig
Viscount Asquith, eldest son of the Earl of Oxford
Viscount Brocas, eldest son of the Earl Jellicoe
Viscount Clanfield, eldest son of the Earl Peel
Lord Irwin, eldest son of the Earl of Halifax
Viscount Ruthven of Canberra, eldest son of the Earl of Gowrie
Viscount Gwynedd, eldest son of the Earl Lloyd George of Dwyfor
Lord Brabourne, eldest son of the Earl Mountbatten of Burma
Viscount Linley, eldest son of the Earl of Snowdon
Viscount Macmillan of Ovenden, eldest son of the Earl of Stockton

Children of peers and peeresses
Viscounts
Lists of children